During the 1896–97 season Hearts competed in the Scottish First Division, the Scottish Cup and the East of Scotland Shield.

Fixtures

Rosebery Charity Cup

Scottish Cup

Edinburgh League

Scottish First Division

See also
List of Heart of Midlothian F.C. seasons

References

Statistical Record 96-97

External links
Official Club website

Scottish football championship-winning seasons
Heart of Midlothian F.C. seasons
Heart of Midlothian